Shahrak-e Piruzi (also Romanized as Shahrak-e Pīrūzī) is a village in Qeblehi Rural District, in the Central District of Dezful County, Khuzestan Province, Iran. At the 2006 census, its population was 541, in 107 families.

References 

Populated places in Dezful County